Kharmerungulatum is an extinct genus of herbivorous mammal from the Late Cretaceous (Maastrichtian) Intertrappean Beds of Madhya Pradesh, India. Its specific epithet honors Leigh Van Valen. It was described as one of the earliest known condylarths.

References

Prehistoric eutherians
Cretaceous mammals
Extinct animals of India
Prehistoric mammal genera